is a junction passenger railway station in located in the town of Kōya, Wakayama Prefecture, Japan, operated by the private railway company Nankai Electric Railway.

Lines
Gokurakubashi Station is served by the Nankai Kōya Line, and is located 64.5 kilometers from the terminus of the line at Shiomibashi Station and 63.8 kilometers from Namba Station. It is also the terminus of the funicular Nankai Cable Line and is 0.8n kilometers from the opposing terminus at

Station layout
The station is staffed.

Platforms

Cable Line

Adjacent stations

History
Gokurakubashi Station opened on February 21, 1929.

Passenger statistics
In fiscal 2019, the station was used by an average of 56 passengers daily (boarding passengers only).

Surrounding area
 Sacred Sites and Pilgrimage Routes in the Kii Mountain Range
Mount Kōya

See also
List of railway stations in Japan

References

External links

 Gokurakubashi Station Official Site

Railway stations in Japan opened in 1929
Railway stations in Wakayama Prefecture
Kōya, Wakayama